Amor Ben Salem is a Tunisian Arabic writer.

Biography 
Amor Ben Salem was born in the village of Métouia in the southeastern province of Gabes in Tunisia where he attended his primary education and secondary education in Gabes. He obtained a diploma in philosophy from Tunis in 1957 after which he flew to Cairo to attend journalism courses at the University of Cairo from 1958 to 1959. He then flew to Beirut to commence his higher education at the High Teachers Institution (Lebanese University), obtaining his bachelor's and master's degrees in the Arabic language and literature in 1960. Upon his return to Tunisia, he had taught in several high schools until 1965, the same year in which he traveled to France to join the University of Paris III: Sorbonne Nouvelle to commence his doctorate degree in Arabic grammar, which he completed in 1968 and returned to Tunisia. He pursued his passion in teaching by joining the High Teachers Institute in Tunis, then lastly the Social and Economic Research and Studies Centre (CERES) as a full-time professor since 1972. He opened and supervised a department dedicated to literature research which remains active after his retirement in October 1993. In his youth, and to date, Amor Ben Salem was a passionate writer and poet, composing prose in both literary and dialect Arabic. He published numerous short stories, novels, plays, children's stories and critical studies. He also published a biographical dictionary of Tunisian writers and anthologies of Tunisian literature.

Bibliography 
"Dīwān ibn Durayd : al-mutawaffá fī 321h-933 /Dirāsah wa-taḥqīq"(), Tūnus, al-Dār al-Tūnsīyah lil-Nashr, 1973.  (Achieve effects Ibn Duraid poetry and prose.)
"Qābādū 1815–1871: ḥayātuhu wa-āṯāruhu wa-tafkīruhu al-islāḥī ", Al-Ǧāmiʿaẗ al-tūnisiyyaẗ, Markaz al-Dirāsāt wa-al-abḥāṯ al-iqtiṣādiyyaẗ wa-al-iǧtimāʿiyyaẗ, Tūnis 1975.(FRBNF|41159577z)(Studies)
An Oasis Without Shadow, "Wāḥaẗ bilā ẓill", (novel) Safaa publishing, Tunis, 1979. Translated to Russian.
The Day of the Lat, "yaom al-lat", (play), The Arab Writers Union, Damascus, 1979.
The Circle of Suffocation, "dairat alekhtinaq", (novel), Safaa publishing, Tunis, 1984. Translated to Polish.
Astarte, "Ištārūt" (play), Al-Janoub publishing, Tunis, 1984. Translated to French.
"AbouJahl Addahhas" (novel), Tunisian Publishing House, 1984. Translated to French « Le Patriarche ». I.C.A.R.E., Paris 1993. .
The Lion and the Statue, "Al-asad wa-al-timṯāl ", (novel), Tunisian Publishing House, Tunis, 1991.
"Alī al-Ġurāb : ḥayātuhu wa adabuhu "(), Tunis : Al-Maṭbaʻaẗ al-ʻAṣriyyaẗ, 1987. (Studies and texts of Alī al-Ġurāb).
Layla and the Sultan, "Layla wassultan", (play), Writers Union, Tunis, 1995.
The Billion, "Al milyār", (short stories), Arabian Book House, Tunis, 1995.
Ancient Times Testament, "Asfār al-ʿahd al-ġābir", (play), Dār Saḥar li-l-našr, Tunis, 1995.
Of Dessert and Sea, "Sahri Bahri", (novel), Dār Saḥar li-l-našr, Tunis, 1995. Translated to Italian.
Sessions of Day and Night, "Maqāmāt al-layl wa-al-nahār min al-ǧabal al-aḥmar ilá al-manār", (short stories), Dār Saḥar li-l-našr, Tunis, 1995.
Marwan in the Land of the Djinn, "Marwan fi bilad ejjan", (novel), Dār Saḥar li-l-našr, Tunis, 2010.
Stories of Mother Elsalha, "Hikayat ommi elsalha", (children stories), Dār Saḥar li-l-našr, Tunis, 2011.
Scents and Flavours, "to'oum wa rawa'eh", (short stories), Dār Saḥar li-l-našr, Tunis, 2012.
Metouian Mythology, "asateer matwiya", (short stories), Dār Saḥar li-l-našr, Tunis, 2012.

Translations
 Al-bahr al-mutawassit, éd. Alif, Tunis, 1990 —Arabic translation works La Méditerranée. L'espace et l'histoire et La Méditerranée. Les hommes et l'héritage, both under the direction of Fernand Braudel

Works 
The novel "Wāḥaẗ bilā ẓill", namely An Oasis Without Shadow, was published in 1979 after ten years of censorship in Tunisia. This novel deals with two main subjects: land reform process with collective farming in Tunisia in the seventies of the last century and migration of most young Tunisians to France, particularly from the town of Métouia and its oasis. The subject of emigration is also discussed in the novel "AbouJahl Addahhas".
"AbouJahl Addahhas", through the complex relationships within migrant families from southern Tunisia who are settled in Lyon while their families remained in Tunisia. Through several storylines, the novel provides perspectives of immigrant workers in France and the lives of their families in the village.
In the novel "Dairat al-ekhtinaq", or The Circle of Suffocation Amor Ben Salem fictionalizes the events that took place in Tunisia the Black Thursday which oppose on 26 January 1978 the Tunisian government to the Tunisian General Labour Union and leads to a general strike with severe repression and imprisonment of trade unionists.
In "Al-asad wa-al-timṯāl, The Lion and the Statue, the author narrates through anthropomorphic animals in line with the classical Arabic book Kalila wa Dimna (translation of Panchatantra) address the behavior of Arab leaders by comparing then to gods surrounded by a courtyard and capable of anything to maintain power.
Similarly, in the drama, "Ištārūt", (inspired by the symbolic Phoenician mythology Astarte) depicts themes of absolute power and the downfall of a tyrant. Thus, Astarte, normally protecting the sovereign Baʿal and his dynasty, revolted and embodies the freedom of the oppressed fighting against the governing God. Ben Salem dedicated this play to "all peoples of the third world without exception."
His collection of short stories, "Sessions of Day and Night", "Maqāmāt al-layl wa-al-nahār min al-ǧabal al-aḥmar ila al-manār", published in the form of Maqamat, which is an original Arabic literary genre of rhymed prose. Ben Salem thematically narrates stories of social inequality in modern Tunisian society, symbolized by animals and plants living in two districts of Tunis: a poor district called "Al-Jabal Al-Ahmar" and the area of the upper class called "Al-Manar".
Of Desert and Sea, is a novel that is mainly social critique of the different facets of the life of a fortunate and wealthy Sheikh – religious scholar – of the Zaitouna University, in the thirties of the twentieth century. The narrative describes the actions and behaviors of one of these bourgeois religious symbols who monopolized high positions of power and exercised relentless support for the existing regimes at the time, regardless of their oppression. The story is a libel of the traditions of this class of men and their imitation of foreigners; especially the ex-colonisers, the French and the Italians, in clothing as in behaviour as well as their immersion in all kinds of immoral profligacy and dissipation.
In his latest novel, Marwan in the Land of the Djinn, "Marwan fi bilad ejjan",, the author takes the reader to a voyage into parallel universe where a superpower raids weaker nations, exploits their land and deteriorates their environment, while describing the resistance of the oppressed people, their struggle against colonization and the protection of their living environment. Ben Salem receives the "special mention" prize of Comar gold 2010 for this last novel..
Scents and Flavours,, is a group of short stories based on a variety of discourse and sequential series of inspiration from elements of recit that deal with flavours and scents that have held on to the memory of those who relay the stories as a result of surrounding circumstances or due to their stances and positions. The characters in this narrative display contrasting origins and orientations, differing education and environments as they deal with various flavours and scents in their lives from their individual perspectives, free from all social and psychological pressures and restrictions imposed by societal values. These stories, in all their diversity of subjects, time and space, stem from the source of memory, and pour into the valley of nostalgia
In Metouian Mythology,, the book relays a collection of short stories about the local mythology of a Tunisian oasis in the village of Métouia in the south-east of the country in which the protagonists' adventures and endeavours are inspired by the local culture and engraved in the people's memories. The stories also rebuild the geological constructs of the village's valleys and springs as well as the anthropological and cultural relationships that are connected to the inhabitants' diversified origins and ethnicities. Through these myths, the reader may contemplate the role that this oasis plays in creating harmony within the community in which it is found, reaching to the passing travellers and caravans whose paths cross the oasis.

References

1932 births
Living people
Tunisian novelists
Tunisian translators
Translators to Arabic